Khurishah is a sub-district located in the Al-Misrakh District, Taiz Governorate, Yemen. Khurishah had a population of 1,564 according to the 2004 census.

Villages
Khurishah Al-suflaa village.
Khurishah AL-'ulyaa village.

References

Sub-districts in Al-Misrakh District